The 1938–39 Ljubljana Subassociation League was the 20th season of the Ljubljana Subassociation League. I. SSK Maribor won the league for the third time, defeating Bratstvo in the final.

Celje subdivision

Ljubljana subdivision

Maribor subdivision

Quarter-final

Semi-final

Final

References

External links
Football Association of Slovenia 

Slovenian Republic Football League seasons
Yugo
2
Football
Football